Church of the Life-Giving Trinity may refer to:

Church of the Life-Giving Trinity (Bataysk)
Church of the Life-Giving Trinity (Kamensk-Shakhtinsky)
Church of the Life-Giving Trinity (Pyongyang)
Church of the Life-Giving Trinity (Volchensky)